Songs From Suburbia is the second album by Spring Heeled Jack. The album was recorded at The Hit Factory recording studio in New York City.

The band released a music video for the song "Jolene". "Time" originally appeared on the band's demo cassette, Connecticut Ska. "Makisupa Policeman" is a cover of the Phish song.

Critical reception
The Houston Press called the band "an insufferably sunny septet from Connecticut's bedroom-community wasteland," writing that "all of it goes down as easily as room-temperature Bud Light inhaled through an Olympic-sized beer bong." The Omaha World-Herald deemed the album "good ska tunes—many with a rock edge."

AllMusic wrote that "while Spring Heeled Jack earned themselves a niche in the East Coast ska scene with their debut album Static World View, the follow-up Songs From Suburbia is far superior."

Track listing
All songs by Spring Heeled Jack USA except "Pop Song (Green)" by Engle, Green and "Makisupa Policeman" by Trey Anastasio.

"Mass Appeal Madness"  – 3:06
"Jolene"  – 3:09
"Beggin'"  – 4:03
"Pop Song" (Green)  – 2:06
"Waiting, Watching"  – 2:40
"Tied Up"  – 3:41
"MCMLIX" (1959)  – 3:31
"Where I Belong"  – 3:33
"Makisupa Policeman"  – 3:27
"Time"  – 2:53
"Morning Sun"  – 3:35
"Man of Tomorrow"  – 3:40

References

1998 albums
Spring Heeled Jack U.S.A. albums